Marneuli is a town in the Kvemo Kartli region of southern Georgia and administrative center of Marneuli Municipality that borders neighboring Azerbaijan and Armenia.

Toponymy 
According to Georgian sources, the name  is of Georgian origin and some have attested the name to "", the Georgian word "winery".

The name used by the Azerbaijanis to refer to the city, The word was borrowed from Persian , meaning "the keeper of camels".

Population
According to the 2014 Georgian census the population of the town was 20,211. The town is predominantly populated by Georgian Azerbaijanis (83,1%).

History
Marneuli is the center of the Marneuli Municipality of Georgia. By the decree of the Georgian SSR of March 18, 1947, the village of Borchalo was renamed into Marneuli. It received the status of a city in 1964.

On July 1, 1625, north of Marneuli near the Algeti River on the Marabda field, a major battle of Georgian troops with the Safavid conquerors took place, the Georgian army under the command of Giorgi Saakadze at first almost defeated the Iranian army of Isa Khan, but then it was still defeated and the Iranians entered Tbilisi.

On December 19, 1918, a battle of the Georgian-Armenian War took place near the Khrami River (8 kilometers south of the regional center). As a result of the armistice established on January 1 at the insistence of the British army, which occupied the location of the German army in the region (after the latter was defeated in the First World War), the city remained in the Georgian-Armenian neutral zone, and was subsequently incorporated into Georgian SSR.

In 1921, Marneuli again became the center of military operations - units of the Soviet 11th Army marched through it in Tbilisi during the Soviet-Georgian war.

On August 8, 2008, during the Russo-Georgian War, Russian planes bombed the city's airfield, as a result of which 3 people died and the airfield's runway was destroyed.

Culture
There is one university branch (Tbilisi State University) and one university opened in 2008 (Heydar Aliyev Georgia-Azerbaijan Humanitarian University) in Marneuli.

See also
 Azerbaijanis in Georgia
Marneuli Municipality
 Kvemo Kartli

References

External links
Map showing Marneuli - Maplandia

Cities and towns in Kvemo Kartli